The National Center of Wildlife (NCW), formerly Saudi Wildlife Authority, is a government agency is Saudi Arabia was established in 1986 and responsible for the protection, preservation and development of wildlife in country.

References

External links
 Official website
 Tourism map

1986 establishments in Saudi Arabia
Government agencies established in 1986
Environment of Saudi Arabia
Government agencies of Saudi Arabia